Polygala poaya is a herbaceous plant native to South America.

References

poaya
Flora of South America